Otaki (also, O-ta-ki and O-ta-kum-ni) is a former Native American settlement in Butte County, California. It was located between the Big and Little Chico creeks east of Michopdo; its precise location is unknown.

See also
Native American history of California

References

Former settlements in Butte County, California
Former Native American populated places in California